Göllersdorf is a town in the district of Hollabrunn in Lower Austria, Austria.

Peter Schidlof (1922–1987), the Austrian-British violist and co-founder of the Amadeus Quartet, was born in Göllersdorf.

Geography
Göllersdorf lies in the Weinviertel in Lower Austria about 15 km north-northwest of Stockerau in the valley of the  Göllersbach. About a third of the municipality is forested.

References

Cities and towns in Hollabrunn District